Phannita Maya (Thai:พัณณิตา มายะ, born 15 June 2004) is a Thai cricketer. In January 2020, at the age of 15, she was selected in Thailand's squad for the 2020 ICC Women's T20 World Cup. Prior to being selected in Thailand's squad for the Women's T20 World Cup, she was in the squad for the qualification tournament in Scotland, playing in a single warm-up match. In November 2021, she was named in Thailand's team for the 2021 Women's Cricket World Cup Qualifier tournament in Zimbabwe.

In October 2022, she played for Thailand in Women's Twenty20 Asia Cup.

References

2004 births
Living people
Phannita Maya
Phannita Maya
Phannita Maya
Phannita Maya